After the end of the Russo-Japanese War of 1905, the Russian Naval General Staff decided that it needed a squadron of fast "armored cruisers" (Броненосный крейсер; bronenosnyy kreyser) that could use their speed to maneuver into position to engage the head of the enemy's battle line, much as Admiral Tōgō had done during the Battle of Tsushima against the Russian fleet. This concept was very different from the primary roles for the battlecruiser envisioned by the British Royal Navy and the Imperial German High Seas Fleet, which consisted of scouting for the main battle fleet and attacking enemy reconnaissance forces. The Royal Navy came to the same conclusion and developed the  fast battleships that could force battle on an enemy fleet and had enough protection to attack any type of ship. However, World War I and the Russian Civil War interrupted the construction of the Russian Borodino-class ships and all were scrapped.

Twenty years later the Soviet Navy issued a requirement for a ship capable of dealing with enemy cruisers, but the design began to grow as it was modified to allow for combat with German pocket battleships on even terms, and later modified to gain parity with the s. Two ships were laid down in 1939, but development of their new guns lagged significantly behind their construction and six  twin-gun turrets were ordered from Germany in 1940. The working drawings for the turrets and guns had not even been received when Operation Barbarossa began in June 1941. The incomplete hulls of both ships were ordered scrapped in 1947.

The Navy revived its requirement for a "cruiser-killer" during the war, but the design process was quite lengthy as questions as to its armament, speed and size were debated. Joseph Stalin was the key supporter of these ships and made many of the important decisions himself, overriding the desires of the Navy. Thus, after his death in 1953, little time was wasted in cancelling the three ships that had been laid down. The hull of the most advanced ship was used as a target and the other two were scrapped on their slipways.

In the 1970s, the Navy initiated a project to construct a nuclear-powered ship capable of accommodating anti-aircraft, anti-ship and anti-submarine guided missiles in a single hull. This type, classed as a "heavy nuclear-powered missile cruiser" by the Soviets, eventually emerged as the largest non-aircraft carrying surface warship built since the end of the Second World War, and was termed in the West as a battlecruiser.

Key

 The Kirov class was fitted with a primarily missile-based main armament; this is reflected in the table with "Main armament" given instead of "Main guns".

Borodino class

The four Borodino-class battlecruisers (also referred to as Izmail class) of the Imperial Russian Navy were all laid down in December 1912 at Saint Petersburg for service with the Baltic Fleet. Construction of the ships was delayed as many domestic factories were already overloaded with orders and some components had to be ordered from abroad. The start of World War I slowed their construction still further as the foreign orders were often not delivered and domestic production was diverted into things more immediately useful for the war effort. The ships were launched in 1915–1916, but the outbreak of the Russian Revolution in 1917 put a stop to their construction, which never resumed. The Soviet Navy gave consideration to completing the ships; initially, Izmail and Borodino were looked at, with a view to finishing one or both to their original design, but the lack of available  guns, combined with the complexity of the originally designed electrical system, led to the idea being dropped. Subsequently, plans were raised to complete Kinburn and Navarin to a modified design with  guns, which again failed due to the difficulty in either obtaining guns from overseas, or manufacturing them domestically. Subsequent ideas included converting some of the hulls for cargo or passenger use, which again failed. The Navy made a serious proposal in 1925 to convert Izmail, the ship closest to completion, to an aircraft carrier, but this plan was later cancelled as a result of political maneuvering on the part of the Red Army. Eventually, all four hulls were broken up for scrap; the second, third and fourth were sold to a German company in 1923, while Izmail was broken up in Leningrad in 1931.

Kronshtadt class

In the 1930s the Soviets began development of a large cruiser (bol'shoy kreyser) capable of destroying  cruisers built to the limits imposed by the Washington Naval Treaty, which the Soviets had not signed. Several designs were proposed, but rejected by the Navy before the concept was merged with the small battleship (Battleship 'B') then being designed for service with the Baltic and Black Sea Fleets after the Soviets agreed to follow the terms of the Second London Naval Treaty in 1937. The new design was significantly larger and was also tasked with dealing with German pocket battleships. Four were ordered shortly afterward, but the beginning of the Great Purge in August 1937 hindered the completion of the design process and the project was cancelled in early 1938 after being criticized as too weak in comparison to foreign ships.

The Navy, however, still had a requirement for a ship capable of defeating enemy cruisers and the original concept was revived as Project 69. The proposed size of the ship continually escalated as the requirement was revised to allow it to fight larger ships like the German s. The preliminary design was finally approved in January 1939 and two ships were laid down in November 1939, before the detailed design had even been approved.

The Project 69 ships were intended to use a newly designed  gun in a new triple turret, but they were both well behind schedule when Joseph Stalin asked the Germans in February 1940 if any triple  turrets were available for purchase under the German–Soviet Commercial Agreement. When they said no, he then asked if any twin  turrets were available instead. Krupp had six incomplete turrets on hand that had originally been ordered before the war to rearm the Scharnhorst-class battleships, but they had been cancelled after the start of World War II. A preliminary purchase agreement was made to buy 12 guns and six turrets later that month, well before any studies were made to see if the substitution was even possible. It was later determined that they could be used, so the agreement was finalized in November 1940 with the deliveries scheduled from October 1941 to 28 March 1943.

"Project 69-I" ("Importnyi" – Imported) modified the two ships to use the German guns, even though they still lacked data for the turrets and their barbettes. The detailed design was supposed to be completed by 15 October 1941, but it was rendered moot when the Germans invaded the Soviet Union in June. Neither ship had progressed very far at that time and both had been damaged during the war, so they were ordered scrapped on 24 March 1947 after some thought had been given to completing Kronshtadt as either an aircraft carrier or a mother ship for whalers.

Stalingrad  class

The Navy reissued its requirements for a large cruiser to destroy enemy light cruisers in 1943, but none of the designs submitted were acceptable. The requirement was reissued in 1944 for a larger ship and the concept was approved by the Politburo in 1945. However, the Navy and the Shipbuilding Commissariat disagreed about the feasibility of laying down any ships of new design before 1950, so a committee was appointed under the chairmanship of Lavrentiy Beria to resolve the issue. It mostly sided with the Shipbuilding Commissariat, but a program of seven large cruisers was approved later that year. All of these changes delayed approval of the detailed design until 1951.

The first ship was begun in November 1951 and the other two followed in 1952; a fourth was apparently ordered from the Severodvinsk shipyard, but was cancelled before being laid down. By this time Stalin's support was the main impetus behind the ships and little time was wasted cancelling them after his death on 5 March 1953. Stalingrads hull was ordered to be used for weapons tests while the two other ships were scrapped where they lay. The hull was launched in 1954 after it was modified to suit its new role. It was towed from Nikolayev to Sevastopol in 1955, but it grounded at the entrance to Sevastopol Bay. Initial attempts to pull it off the rocks by brute force failed, and the capsizing of the battleship  further delayed salvage work, so that she was not freed until mid-1956. She served as a target for the first generation of Soviet anti-ship missiles and a wide variety of armor-piercing weapons before she was scrapped in the early 1960s, probably 1962.

Kirov class

In the 1960s, the Soviet Union originated Project 1144 Orlan, a project intended to design and build a large, nuclear powered anti-submarine vessel. At the time, the Soviets did not envisage that arming surface ships with anti-ship missiles was required, as then current doctrine had it that submarines were the main platform for attacking enemy shipping. However, the sinking of the Israeli destroyer INS Eilat in 1967 by anti-ship missiles fired from an Egyptian missile boat led to a re-think of the use of surface ships in the role. The threat of US Navy surface ships, which were increasingly capable of a range of different missions, led to the idea of a single ship combining anti-aircraft, anti-ship and anti-submarine capabilities crystalising.

Under the original specifications laid out in 1969, the new ship was originally classified as "nuclear antisubmarine cruiser" (atomnyy protivolodochnyy kreyser). The first hull was laid down at the Baltiysky Zavod in Leningrad in March 1974 under the name . By the time the ship was launched in December 1977, she had been reclassified as a "heavy nuclear-powered guided missile cruiser" (tyazholyy atomnyy raketnyy), built around a primary armament of 20 SS-N-19 Shipwreck anti-ship missiles. When Frunze was commissioned in 1984, it was seen to have a different weapons fit to Kirov, with the pair of single 100 mm guns swapped for a twin  turret, and the SS-N-14 Silex ASW missile system deleted in favour of adding eight SA-N-9 Gauntlet SAM launchers. In the event, none of the four ships of the class received a completely identical armament fit. Additionally, the hull and propulsion machinery of the Kirov-class was used for the Soviet Navy's C3 vessel Ural.

The size of the Kirov class was approximately  full load. This was around the same size as a First World War super-dreadnought battleship, and significantly bigger than any contemporary cruiser design, leading to commentators in the west describing them as "battlecruisers". Their appearance was a major factor in the US Navy reactivating its four s in the early 1980s. The fourth unit, was launched in April 1989, with plans advanced for a fifth ship, to be named Kuznetsov. However, the fall of the Soviet Union saw funding for the Navy collapse—the fourth ship, renamed as Pyotr Velikiy (Peter the Great), was not commissioned until 1998, while the fifth hull was cancelled, and the remaining three laid up in varying states of disrepair. Although the first ship, Kirov began a planned overhaul in 1999, this was halted in 2001, with the decision taken to dismantle the ship instead. Kalinin (renamed as Admiral Nakhimov in 1992), considered to be in better condition, was scheduled to undergo a major overhaul to return her to active service by 2021. However, problems in completing the work saw the ships' delivery date pushed back to 2023. Once Admiral Nakhimov has rejoined the fleet, Pyotr Velikiy is planned to undergo a similar modernization. The fate of Frunze, renamed as Admiral Lazarev, was less clear, as the intention was to carry out an inspection of the ship to determine its overall condition once work on Admiral Nakhimov was completed. However, in April 2019 it was announced that both Kirov, having already been defuelled, and Admiral Lazarev were to be finally withdrawn and broken up. Admiral Lazarev was sold for scrapping in February 2021.

Footnotes

Citations

References

 
 
 
 
 
 
 
 
 
 

 
Russia
Battlecruisers